Christmas Greetings is a studio album of phonograph records by Bing Crosby  released in 1949 featuring popular Christmas songs.

Background
Crosby had recorded Christmas songs for the first time in 1935 and he had a huge hit with "Silent Night" that year. In 1942, he recorded "White Christmas" with the John Scott Trotter Orchestra and the Ken Darby Singers for Decca Records in just 18 minutes on May 29, 1942, and it was released on July 30 as part of an album of six 78-rpm discs from the film Holiday Inn. In 1943, he recorded three more songs with a holiday theme – "Jingle Bells", "Santa Claus Is Comin' to Town", and "I'll Be Home for Christmas". All of these songs were huge hits and the issue of a 78rpm set called Merry Christmas in 1945 firmly cemented Crosby’s association with the Christmas season.
The Merry Christmas album has been available in one form or another ever since 1945 and in 1949 Decca decided to issue the Christmas Greetings album to complement this.

Reception
Billboard reviewed the album saying: "Crosby single-handed has something of a corner on the Christmas market with his 'Merry Christmas' album and 'White Christmas'.  This new album should widen that corner even more, for Bing is at his best and has the benefit of some top-notch support in the disposition of this collection of a couple of new seasonal pops and a group of familiar carols. A top-notch seasonal package which should stand out head-and-shoulders in sales over most any other new Christmas entry."

The album peaked at No. 4 in Billboards best-selling albums chart for the week ending December 30, 1949. His Merry Christmas album was in first place.

Track listing
The songs were featured on a 3-disc, 78 rpm album set, Decca Album A-715.

Disc 1: (24658)

Disc 2: (24659)

Disc 3: (24670)

LP track listing
The 1949 10" LP album issue Decca DL 5020 consisted of  Decca A-715' (details above) plus two additional songs "The Christmas Song" and "O Fir Tree Dark".

45 rpm releases
The album was also issued as catalog number 9-66 in the form of three 45rpm vinyl discs in 1950 with identical tracks to the 78rpm release A-715. Subsequently, it was issued on two EP records numbered ED 561 which included the two extra songs on the 10" LP.

References

Bing Crosby albums
1949 albums
Christmas albums by American artists
Decca Records albums